Kimes Hollow is a valley in Oregon County in the U.S. state of Missouri.

Kimes Hollow has the name of the local Kimes family.

References

Valleys of Oregon County, Missouri
Valleys of Missouri